Acleris implexana is a species of moth of the family Tortricidae. It is found in Norway, Sweden, Finland, Russia and North America, where it has been recorded from Quebec to British Columbia and adjacent areas of the United States.

The wingspan is 13–14 mm. The forewings are light yellowish with a grey triangular or semicircular patch along the costa, containing several darker grey spots. The hindwings are uniform and slightly paler than the forewings. Adults are on wing from late August to October.

The larvae feed on the leaves of Pinus and Salix species. They have also been recorded feeding in the pine cone willow gall, caused by the gall midge Rabdophaga strobiloides.

Subspecies
Acleris implexana implexana (North America)
Acleris implexana ferrumixtana (Benander, 1934) (Europe)

References

Moths described in 1863
implexana
Moths of Europe
Moths of North America